Taranaki Stakes was a horse race for thoroughbred racehorses held in New Zealand. The first race was held in 1915 at the Taranaki Jockey Club's August meeting.

References

Horse races in New Zealand